Malado Maïga (born 30 June 1986) is a Malian former footballer. She has been a member of the Mali women's national team.

Club career
Maïga has played in her country for Super Lionnes.

International career
Maïga capped for Mali at senior level during the 2010 African Women's Championship.

References

1986 births
Living people
Malian women's footballers
Mali women's international footballers
21st-century Malian people
Women's association footballers not categorized by position